The 1957 Round Australia Trial, officially the Ampol Trial was the sixth running of the Round Australia Trial. The rally took place between 7 and 21 July 1957. The event covered 9,660 kilometres around Australia. It was won by Jack Witter and Doug Stewart, driving a Volkswagen 1200.

Results

References

Rally competitions in Australia
Round Australia Trial